The Huon Show or Huon Agricultural Show is an annual agricultural show running from 1947 to 2019 & since 2022, located at Ranelagh Showgrounds in Ranelagh in the Huon Valley, Tasmania, Australia. It attracts around 13,000 visitors yearly, featuring a range of attractions including a large local produce section, exhibition livestock including a large Alpaca section, flower competitions, and over 102 stalls by local businesses. It is held on the second Saturday of every November, though it used to be held on 8 December, which was for some time a bank holiday for residents of the Huon Valley.

This show has been on hiatus since 2020 because of COVID-19 pandemic.

Marion Woodward has served as assistant secretary and then secretary of the show since 1967.

References

Agricultural shows in Australia
Recurring events established in 1947
Festivals in Tasmania
Huon Valley